NGC 7032 is a spiral galaxy located about 140 million light-years away in the constellation Pavo. It has an estimated diameter of 71,370 light-years. NGC 7032 was discovered by astronomer John Herschel on July 20, 1835.

See also 
 NGC 5055
 List of NGC objects (7001–7840)

References

External links 

Unbarred spiral galaxies
Pavo (constellation)
7032
66427
Astronomical objects discovered in 1835